

Events

Pre-1600
 193 – The distinguished soldier Septimius Severus is proclaimed emperor by the army in Illyricum. 
 475 – Byzantine Emperor Basiliscus issues a circular letter (Enkyklikon) to the bishops of his empire, supporting the Monophysite christological position.
 537 – Siege of Rome: The Byzantine general Belisarius receives his promised reinforcements, 1,600 cavalry, mostly of Hunnic or Slavic origin and expert bowmen. He starts, despite shortages, raids against the Gothic camps and Vitiges is forced into a stalemate.
1241 – Battle of Liegnitz: Mongol forces defeat the Polish and German armies.
1288 – Mongol invasions of Vietnam: Yuan forces are defeated by Trần forces in the Battle of Bach Dang in present-day northern Vietnam.
1388 – Despite being outnumbered 16 to 1, forces of the Old Swiss Confederacy are victorious over the Archduchy of Austria in the Battle of Näfels.
1454 – The Treaty of Lodi is signed, establishing a balance of power among northern Italian city-states for almost 50 years.

1601–1900
1609 – Eighty Years' War: Spain and the Dutch Republic sign the Treaty of Antwerp to initiate twelve years of truce.
  1609   – Philip III of Spain issues the decree of the "Expulsion of the Moriscos".
1682 – Robert Cavelier de La Salle discovers the mouth of the Mississippi River, claims it for France and names it Louisiana.
1784 – The Treaty of Paris, ratified by the United States Congress on January 14, 1784, is ratified by King George III of the Kingdom of Great Britain, ending the American Revolutionary War. Copies of the ratified documents are exchanged on May 12, 1784.
1860 – On his phonautograph machine, Édouard-Léon Scott de Martinville makes the oldest known recording of an audible human voice.
1865 – American Civil War: Robert E. Lee surrenders the Army of Northern Virginia (26,765 troops) to Ulysses S. Grant at Appomattox Court House, Virginia, effectively ending the war.

1901–present
1909 – The U.S. Congress passes the Payne–Aldrich Tariff Act.
1917 – World War I: The Battle of Arras: The battle begins with Canadian Corps executing a massive assault on Vimy Ridge.
1918 – World War I: The Battle of the Lys: The Portuguese Expeditionary Corps is crushed by the German forces during what is called the Spring Offensive on the Belgian region of Flanders.
1937 – The Kamikaze arrives at Croydon Airport in London. It is the first Japanese-built aircraft to fly to Europe.
1939 – African-American singer Marian Anderson gives a concert at the Lincoln Memorial after being denied the use of Constitution Hall by the Daughters of the American Revolution.
1940 – World War II: Operation Weserübung: Germany invades Denmark and Norway.
  1940   – Vidkun Quisling seizes power in Norway.
1942 – World War II: The Battle of Bataan ends. An Indian Ocean raid by Japan's 1st Air Fleet sinks the British aircraft carrier  and the Australian destroyer .
1945 – Dietrich Bonhoeffer, Lutheran pastor and anti-Nazi dissident, is executed by the Nazi regime.
  1945   – World War II: The German heavy cruiser Admiral Scheer is sunk by the Royal Air Force.
  1945   – World War II: The Battle of Königsberg, in East Prussia, ends.
  1945   – The United States Atomic Energy Commission is formed.
1947 – The Glazier–Higgins–Woodward tornadoes kill 181 and injure 970 in Texas, Oklahoma, and Kansas.
  1947   – The Journey of Reconciliation, the first interracial Freedom Ride begins through the upper South in violation of Jim Crow laws. The riders wanted enforcement of the United States Supreme Court's 1946 Irene Morgan decision that banned racial segregation in interstate travel.
  1947   – United Nations Security Council Resolution 22 relating to Corfu Channel incident is adopted.
1948 – Jorge Eliécer Gaitán's assassination provokes a violent riot in Bogotá (the Bogotazo), and a further ten years of violence in Colombia.
  1948   – Fighters from the Irgun and Lehi Zionist paramilitary groups attacked Deir Yassin near Jerusalem, killing over 100.
1952 – Hugo Ballivián's government is overthrown by the Bolivian National Revolution, starting a period of agrarian reform, universal suffrage and the nationalization of tin mines
1957 – The Suez Canal in Egypt is cleared and opens to shipping following the Suez Crisis.
1959 – Project Mercury: NASA announces the selection of the United States' first seven astronauts, whom the news media quickly dub the "Mercury Seven".
1960 – Dr. Hendrik Verwoerd, Prime Minister of South Africa and architect of apartheid, narrowly survives an assassination attempt by a white farmer, David Pratt in Johannesburg.
1967 – The first Boeing 737 (a 100 series) makes its maiden flight.
1969 – The first British-built Concorde 002 makes its maiden flight from Filton to RAF Fairford.
1980 – The Iraqi regime of Saddam Hussein kills philosopher Muhammad Baqir al-Sadr and his sister Bint al-Huda after three days of torture.
1981 – The U.S. Navy nuclear submarine  accidentally collides with the Nissho Maru, a Japanese cargo ship, sinking it and killing two Japanese sailors.
1989 – Tbilisi massacre: An anti-Soviet peaceful demonstration and hunger strike in Tbilisi, demanding restoration of Georgian independence, is dispersed by the Soviet Army, resulting in 20 deaths and hundreds of injuries.
1990 – An IRA bombing in County Down, Northern Ireland, kills three members of the UDR.
1991 – Georgia declares independence from the Soviet Union.
1992 – A U.S. Federal Court finds former Panamanian dictator Manuel Noriega guilty of drug and racketeering charges. He is sentenced to 30 years in prison.
2003 – Iraq War: Baghdad falls to American forces.
2009 – In Tbilisi, Georgia, up to 60,000 people protest against the government of Mikheil Saakashvili.
2013 – A 6.1–magnitude earthquake strikes Iran killing 32 people and injuring over 850 people.
  2013   – At least 13 people are killed and another three injured after a man goes on a spree shooting in the Serbian village of Velika Ivanča.
2014 – A student stabs 20 people at Franklin Regional High School in Murrysville, Pennsylvania.
2017 – The Palm Sunday church bombings at Coptic churches in Tanta and Alexandria, Egypt, take place.
  2017 – After refusing to give up his seat on an overbooked United Express flight, Dr. David Dao Duy Anh is forcibly dragged off the flight by aviation security officers, leading to major criticism of United Airlines.
  2021 – Burmese military and security forces commit the Bago massacre, during which at least 82 civilians are killed

Births

Pre-1600 
1096 – Al-Muqtafi, caliph of the Abbasid Caliphate (d. 1160)
1285 – Ayurbarwada Buyantu Khan, Emperor Renzong of Yuan (d. 1320)
1458 – Camilla Battista da Varano, Italian saint (d. 1524)
1498 – Jean, Cardinal of Lorraine (d. 1550)
1586 – Julius Henry, Duke of Saxe-Lauenburg (d. 1665)
1597 – John Davenport, English minister, co-founded the New Haven Colony (d. 1670)
1598 – Johann Crüger, Sorbian-German composer and theorist (d. 1662)

1601–1900
1624 – Henrik Rysensteen, Dutch military engineer (d. 1679)
1627 – Johann Caspar Kerll, German organist and composer (d. 1693)
1634 – Countess Albertine Agnes of Nassau (d. 1696)
1648 – Henri de Massue, Earl of Galway, French soldier and diplomat (d. 1720)
1649 – James Scott, 1st Duke of Monmouth, English general and politician, Lord Lieutenant of Staffordshire (d. 1685)
1654 – Samuel Fritz, Czech Jesuit missionary to South America (d. 1725?)
1680 – Philippe Néricault Destouches, French playwright (d. 1754)
1686 – James Craggs the Younger, English politician, Secretary of State for the Southern Department (d. 1721)
1691 – Johann Matthias Gesner, German scholar and academic (d. 1761)
1717 – Georg Matthias Monn, Austrian organist, composer, and educator (d. 1750)
1770 – Thomas Johann Seebeck, German physicist and academic (d. 1831)
1773 – Étienne Aignan, French author and academic (d. 1824)
1794 – Theobald Boehm, German flute player and composer (d. 1881)
1802 – Elias Lönnrot, Finnish physician and philologist (d. 1884)
1806 – Isambard Kingdom Brunel, English engineer, designed the Clifton Suspension Bridge (d. 1859)
1807 – James Bannerman, Scottish theologian and academic (d. 1868)
1821 – Charles Baudelaire, French poet and critic (d. 1867)
1830 – Eadweard Muybridge, English photographer and cinematographer (d. 1904)
1835 – Leopold II of Belgium (d. 1909)
  1835   – Somerset Lowry-Corry, 4th Earl Belmore (d. 1913)
1846 – Paolo Tosti, Italian-English composer and educator (d. 1916)
1848 – Ezequiél Moreno y Díaz, Spanish Augustinian Recollect priest and saint (d. 1906)
1865 – Erich Ludendorff, German general and politician (d. 1937)
  1865   – Charles Proteus Steinmetz, Polish-American mathematician and engineer (d. 1923)
1867 – Chris Watson, Chilean-Australian journalist and politician, 3rd Prime Minister of Australia (d. 1941)
  1867   – Charles Winckler, Danish tug of war competitor, discus thrower, and shot putter (d. 1932)
1872 – Léon Blum, French lawyer and politician, Prime Minister of France (d. 1950)
1875 – Jacques Futrelle, American journalist and author (d. 1912)
1880 – Jan Letzel, Czech architect (d. 1925)
1882 – Frederick Francis IV, Grand Duke of Mecklenburg-Schwerin (d. 1946)
  1882   – Otz Tollen, German actor (d. 1965)
1883 – Frank King, American cartoonist (d. 1969)
1887 – Konrad Tom, Polish actor, writer, singer, and director (d. 1957)
1888 – Sol Hurok, Ukrainian-American talent manager (d. 1974)
1893 – Charles E. Burchfield, American painter (d.1967)
  1893   – Victor Gollancz, English publisher, founded Victor Gollancz Ltd (d. 1967)
  1893   – Rahul Sankrityayan, Indian linguist, author, and scholar (d. 1963)
1895 – Mance Lipscomb, American singer-songwriter and guitarist (d. 1976)
  1895   – Michel Simon, Swiss-French actor (d. 1975)
1897 – John B. Gambling, American radio host (d. 1974)
1898 – Curly Lambeau, American football player and coach (d. 1965)
  1898   – Paul Robeson, American singer, actor, and activist (d. 1976)
1900 – Allen Jenkins, American actor and singer (d. 1974)

1901–present
1901 – Jean Bruchési, Canadian historian and author (d. 1979)
  1901   – Paul Willis, American actor and director (d. 1960)
1902 – Théodore Monod, French explorer and scholar (d. 2000)
1903 – Ward Bond, American actor (d. 1960)
1904 – Sharkey Bonano, American singer, trumpet player, and bandleader (d. 1972)
1905 – J. William Fulbright, American lawyer and politician (d. 1995)
1906 – Rafaela Aparicio, Spanish actress (d. 1996)
  1906   – Antal Doráti, Hungarian-American conductor and composer (d. 1988)
  1906   – Hugh Gaitskell, British politician and leader of the Labour Party (d. 1963)
  1906   – Victor Vasarely, Hungarian-French painter (d. 1997)
1908 – Joseph Krumgold, American author and screenwriter (d. 1980)
  1908   – Paula Nenette Pepin, French composer, pianist and lyricist (d. 1990)
1909 – Robert Helpmann, Australian dancer, actor, and choreographer (d. 1986)
1910 – Abraham A. Ribicoff, American lawyer and politician, 4th United States Secretary of Health and Human Services (d. 1998)
1912 – Lev Kopelev, Ukrainian-German author and academic (d. 1997)
1915 – Daniel Johnson Sr., Canadian lawyer and politician, 20th Premier of Quebec (d. 1968)
1916 – Julian Dash, American swing music jazz tenor saxophonist (d. 1974)
  1916   – Heinz Meyer, German Fallschirmjäger (paratrooper) during World War II (d. 1987)
  1916   – Bill Leonard, American journalist (d. 1994)
1917 – Johannes Bobrowski, German songwriter and poet (d. 1965)
  1917   – Ronnie Burgess, Welsh international footballer and manager (d. 2005)
  1917   – Brad Dexter, American actor (d. 2002)
  1917   – Henry Hewes, American theater writer (d. 2006)
1918 – Jørn Utzon, Danish architect, designed the Sydney Opera House (d. 2008)
1919 – J. Presper Eckert, American engineer, invented the ENIAC (d. 1995)
1921 – Jean-Marie Balestre, French businessman (d. 2008)
  1921   – Yitzhak Navon, Israeli politician (d. 2015)
  1921   – Frankie Thomas, American actor (d. 2006)
  1921   – Mary Jackson, African-American mathematician and aerospace engineer (d. 2005)
1922 – Carl Amery, German author and activist (d. 2005)
1923 – Leonard Levy, American historian and author (d. 2006)
1924 – Arthur Shaw, English professional footballer (d. 2015)
1925 – Virginia Gibson, American actress, singer, and dancer (d. 2013)
  1925   – Art Kane, American photographer (d. 1995)
1926 – Gerry Fitt, Northern Irish soldier and politician; British life peer (d. 2005)
  1926   – Hugh Hefner, American publisher, founded Playboy Enterprises (d. 2017)
  1926   – Harris Wofford, American politician, author, and civil rights activist (d. 2019)
1927 – Tiny Hill, New Zealand rugby player (d. 2019)
1928 – Paul Arizin, American basketball player (d. 2006)
  1928   – Tom Lehrer, American singer-songwriter, pianist, and mathematician
1929 – Sharan Rani Backliwal, Indian sarod player and scholar (d. 2008)
  1929   – Fred Hollows, New Zealand-Australian ophthalmologist (d. 1993)
  1929   – Paule Marshall, American author and academic (d. 2019)
1930 – Nathaniel Branden, Canadian-American psychotherapist and author (d. 2014)
  1930   – F. Albert Cotton, American chemist and academic (d. 2007)
  1930   – Jim Fowler, American zoologist and television host (d. 2019)
  1930   – Wallace McCain, Canadian businessman, founded McCain Foods (d. 2011)
1931 – Richard Hatfield, Canadian lawyer and politician, 26th Premier of New Brunswick (d. 1991)
1932 – Armin Jordan, Swiss conductor (d. 2006)
  1932   – Peter Moores, English businessman and philanthropist (d. 2016)
  1932   – Carl Perkins, American singer-songwriter and guitarist (d. 1998)
1933 – Jean-Paul Belmondo, French actor and producer (d. 2021)
  1933   – René Burri, Swiss photographer and journalist (d. 2014)
  1933   – Fern Michaels, American author
  1933   – Richard Rose, American political scientist and academic
  1933   – Gian Maria Volonté, Italian actor (d. 1994)
1934 – Bill Birch, New Zealand surveyor and politician, 38th New Zealand Minister of Finance
  1934   – Tom Phillis, Australian motorcycle racer (d. 1962)
  1934   – Mariya Pisareva, Russian high jumper
1935 – Aulis Sallinen, Finnish composer and academic
  1935   – Avery Schreiber, American actor and comedian (d. 2002)
1936 – Jerzy Maksymiuk, Polish pianist, composer, and conductor
  1936   – Valerie Solanas, American radical feminist author, attempted murderer (d. 1988)
1937 – Simon Brown, Baron Brown of Eaton-under-Heywood, English lieutenant, lawyer, and judge
  1937   – Marty Krofft, Canadian screenwriter and producer
  1937   – Valerie Singleton, English television and radio host
1938 – Viktor Chernomyrdin, Russian businessman and politician, 30th Prime Minister of Russia (d. 2010)
1939 – Michael Learned, American actress 
1940 – Hans-Joachim Reske, German sprinter
  1940   – Jim Roberts, Canadian-American ice hockey player and coach (d. 2015)
1941 – Kay Adams, American singer-songwriter
  1941   – Hannah Gordon, Scottish actress
1942 – Brandon deWilde, American actor (d. 1972)
  1942   – Margo Smith, American singer-songwriter
1943 – Leila Khaled, Palestinian activist
  1943   – Terry Knight, American singer-songwriter and producer (d. 2004)
  1943   – Clive Sullivan, Welsh rugby league player (d. 1985)
1944 – Joe Brinkman, American baseball player and umpire
  1944   – Heinz-Joachim Rothenburg, German shot putter
1945 – Steve Gadd, American drummer and percussionist
1946 – Nate Colbert, American baseball player (d. 2023)
  1946   – Alan Knott, English cricketer
  1946   – Sara Parkin, Scottish activist and politician
  1946   – David Webb, English footballer, coach, and manager
1947 – Giovanni Andrea Cornia, Italian economist and academic
1948 – Jaya Bachchan, Indian actress and politician
  1948   – Tito Gómez, Puerto Rican salsa singer (d. 2007)
  1948   – Michel Parizeau, Canadian ice hockey player and coach
  1948   – Patty Pravo, Italian singer
1949 – Tony Cragg, English sculptor
1952 – Robert Clark, American author
  1952   – Bruce Robertson, New Zealand rugby player
  1952   – Tania Tsanaklidou, Greek singer and actress
1953 – John Howard, English singer-songwriter and pianist
  1953   – Hal Ketchum, American singer-songwriter and guitarist (d. 2020)
  1953   – Stephen Paddock, American mass murderer responsible for the 2017 Las Vegas shooting (d. 2017)
1954 – Ken Kalfus, American journalist and author
  1954   – Dennis Quaid, American actor
  1954   – Iain Duncan Smith, British soldier and politician, Secretary of State for Work and Pensions
1955 – Yamina Benguigui, Algerian-French director and politician
  1955   – Joolz Denby, English poet and author
1956 – Miguel Ángel Russo, Argentinian footballer and coach
  1956   – Nigel Shadbolt, English computer scientist and academic
  1956   – Vahur Sova, Estonian architect
  1956   – Marina Zoueva, Russian ice dancer and coach
1957 – Seve Ballesteros, Spanish golfer and architect (d. 2011)
  1957   – Martin Margiela, Belgian fashion designer
  1957   – Jamie Redfern, English-born Australian television presenter and pop singer
1958 – Nadey Hakim, British-Lebanese surgeon and sculptor
  1958   – Tony Sibson, English boxer
  1958   – Nigel Slater, English food writer and author
1959 – Bernard Jenkin, English businessman and politician, Shadow Secretary of State for Defence
1960 – Jaak Aab, Estonian educator and politician, Minister of Social Affairs of Estonia
1961 – Mark Kelly, Irish keyboard player 
  1961   – Kirk McCaskill, Canadian-American baseball and hockey player
1962 – John Eaves, American production designer and illustrator
  1962   – Ihor Podolchak, Ukrainian director, producer, and screenwriter
  1962   – Imran Sherwani, English field hockey player
  1962   – Jeff Turner, American basketball player, coach, and sportscaster
1963 – Marc Jacobs, American-French fashion designer
  1963   – Joe Scarborough, American journalist, lawyer, and politician
1964 – Rob Awalt, German-American football player
  1964   – Juliet Cuthbert, Jamaican sprinter
  1964   – Doug Ducey, American politician and businessman, 23rd Governor of Arizona
  1964   – Peter Penashue, Canadian businessman and politician, 9th Canadian Minister of Intergovernmental Affairs
  1964   – Margaret Peterson Haddix, American author
  1964   – Rick Tocchet, Canadian-American ice hockey player and coach
1965 – Helen Alfredsson, Swedish golfer
  1965   – Paulina Porizkova, Czech-born Swedish-American model and actress
  1965   – Jeff Zucker, American businessman
  1965   – Mark Pellegrino, American actor
1966 – John Hammond, English weather forecaster
  1966   – Cynthia Nixon, American actress
1967 – Natascha Engel, German-English translator and politician
  1967   – Sam Harris, American author, philosopher, and neuroscientist
1968 – Jay Chandrasekhar, American actor, comedian, writer and director
1969 – Barnaby Kay, English actor
  1969   – Linda Kisabaka, German runner
1970 – Chorão, Brazilian singer-songwriter (d. 2013)
1971 – Peter Canavan, Irish footballer and manager
  1971   – Leo Fortune-West, English footballer and manager
  1971   – Austin Peck, American actor
  1971   – Jacques Villeneuve, Canadian race car driver
1972 – Bernard Ackah, German-Japanese martial artist and kick-boxer
  1972   – Siiri Vallner, Estonian architect
1974 – Megan Connolly, Australian actress (d. 2001)
  1974   – Jenna Jameson, American actress and pornographic performer
1975 – Robbie Fowler, English footballer and manager
  1975   – David Gordon Green, American director and screenwriter
1976 – Kyle Peterson, American baseball player and sportscaster
1977 – Gerard Way, American singer-songwriter and comic book writer
1978 – Kousei Amano, Japanese actor
  1978   – Jorge Andrade, Portuguese footballer
  1978   – Rachel Stevens, English singer-songwriter, dancer, and actress
1979 – Jeff Reed, American football player
  1979   – Keshia Knight Pulliam, American actress
1980 – Sarah Ayton, English sailor
  1980   – Luciano Galletti, Argentinian footballer
  1980   – Albert Hammond Jr., American singer-songwriter and guitarist 
1981 – Milan Bartovič, Slovak ice hockey player
  1981   – A. J. Ellis, American baseball player
  1981   – Ireneusz Jeleń, Polish footballer
  1981   – Dennis Sarfate, American baseball player
  1981   – Eric Harris, American mass murderer, responsible for the Columbine High School massacre  (d. 1999)
1982 – Jay Baruchel, Canadian actor
  1982   – Carlos Hernández, Costa Rican footballer
  1982   – Kathleen Munroe, Canadian-American actress
1983 – Ryan Clark, Australian actor
1984 – Habiba Ghribi, Tunisian runner
  1984   – Adam Loewen, Canadian baseball player
  1984   – Óscar Razo, Mexican footballer
1985 – Antonio Nocerino, Italian footballer
  1985   – David Robertson, American baseball player
1986 – Mike Hart, American football player
  1986   – Leighton Meester, American actress
1987 – Kassim Abdallah, French-Comorian footballer
  1987   – Graham Gano, American football player
  1987   – Craig Mabbitt, American singer
  1987   – Jesse McCartney, American singer-songwriter and actor
  1987   – Jarrod Mullen, Australian rugby league player
  1987   – Jazmine Sullivan, American singer-songwriter
  1988   – Jeremy Metcalfe, English racing driver
1989 – Danielle Kahle, American figure skater
1990 – Kristen Stewart, American actress
  1990   – Ryan Williams, American football player
1991 – Gai Assulin, Israeli footballer
  1991   – Ryan Kelly, American basketball player
  1991   – Mary Killman, American synchronized swimmer
1992 – Joshua Ledet, American singer
1994 – Joey Pollari, American actor
1995 – Domagoj Bošnjak, Croatian basketball player
  1995   – Robert Bauer, German-Kazakhstani footballer
  1995   – Demi Vermeulen, Dutch Paralympic equestrian
1996 – Jayden Brailey, Australian rugby league player
  1996   – Giovani Lo Celso, Argentinian international footballer
1998 – Elle Fanning, American actress
1999 – Montero Lamar Hill, American rapper
2000 – Jackie Evancho, American singer
2004 – Thomas Simons, British YouTuber and Twitch streamer

Deaths

Pre-1600
585 BC – Jimmu, emperor of Japan (b. 711 BC)
 436 – Tan Daoji, Chinese general and politician
 491 – Zeno, emperor of the Byzantine Empire (b. 425)
 682 – Maslama ibn Mukhallad al-Ansari, Egyptian politician, Governor of Egypt (b. 616)
 715 – Constantine, pope of the Catholic Church (b. 664)
1024 – Benedict VIII, pope of the Catholic Church (b. 980)
1137 – William X, duke of Aquitaine (b. 1099)
1241 – Henry II, High Duke of Poland (b. 1196)
1283 – Margaret of Scotland, queen of Norway (b. 1261)
1327 – Walter Stewart, 6th High Steward of Scotland, Scottish nobleman (ca. 1296)
1483 – Edward IV, king of England (b. 1442)
1484 – Edward of Middleheim, prince of Wales (b. 1473)
1550 – Alqas Mirza, Safavid prince (b. 1516)
1553 – François Rabelais, French monk and scholar (b. 1494)
1557 – Mikael Agricola, Finnish priest and scholar (b. 1510)
1561 – Jean Quintin, French priest, knight and writer (b. 1500)

1601–1900
1626 – Francis Bacon, English jurist and politician, Attorney General for England and Wales (b. 1561)
1654 – Matei Basarab, Romanian prince (b. 1588)
1693 – Roger de Rabutin, Comte de Bussy, French author (b. 1618)
1747 – Simon Fraser, 11th Lord Lovat, Scottish soldier and politician (b. 1667)
1754 – Christian Wolff, German philosopher and academic (b. 1679)
1761 – William Law, English priest and theologian (b. 1686)
1768 – Sarah Fielding, English author (b. 1710)
1804 – Jacques Necker, Swiss-French politician, Chief Minister to the French Monarch (b. 1732)
1806 – William V, stadtholder of the Dutch Republic (b. 1748)
1872 – Erastus Corning, American businessman and politician (b. 1794)
1876 – Charles Goodyear, American lawyer, judge, and politician (b. 1804)
1882 – Dante Gabriel Rossetti, English poet and painter (b. 1828)
1889 – Michel Eugène Chevreul, French chemist and academic (b. 1786)

1901–present
1904 – Isabella II, Spanish queen (b. 1830)
1909 – Helena Modjeska, Polish-American actress (b. 1840)
1915 – Raymond Whittindale, English rugby player (b. 1883)
1917 – James Hope Moulton, English philologist and scholar (b. 1863)
1922 – Hans Fruhstorfer, German entomologist and explorer (b. 1866)
1926 – Zip the Pinhead, American freak show performer (b. 1857)
1936 – Ferdinand Tönnies, German sociologist and philosopher (b. 1855)
1940 – Mrs Patrick Campbell, English actress (b. 1865)
1944 – Yevgeniya Rudneva, Ukrainian lieutenant and pilot (b. 1920)
1945 – Dietrich Bonhoeffer, German pastor and theologian (b. 1906)
  1945   – Wilhelm Canaris, German admiral (b. 1887)
  1945   – Johann Georg Elser, German carpenter (b. 1903)
  1945   – Hans Oster, German general (b. 1887)
  1945   – Karl Sack, German lawyer and jurist (b. 1896)
  1945   – Hans von Dohnányi, Austrian-German lawyer and jurist (b. 1902)
1948 – George Carpenter, Australian 5th General of The Salvation Army (b. 1872)
  1948   – Jorge Eliécer Gaitán, Colombian lawyer and politician, 16th Colombian Minister of National Education (b. 1903)
1951 – Vilhelm Bjerknes, Norwegian physicist and meteorologist (b. 1862)
1953 – Eddie Cochems, American football player and coach (b. 1877)
  1953   – C. E. M. Joad, English philosopher and television host (b. 1891)
  1953   – Hans Reichenbach, German philosopher from the Vienna Circle (b. 1891)
1959 – Frank Lloyd Wright, American architect, designed the Price Tower and Fallingwater (b. 1867)
1961 – Zog I of Albania (b. 1895)
1963 – Eddie Edwards, American trombonist (b. 1891)
  1963   – Xul Solar, Argentinian painter and sculptor (b. 1887)
1970 – Gustaf Tenggren, Swedish-American illustrator and animator (b. 1896)
1976 – Dagmar Nordstrom, American singer-songwriter and pianist (b. 1903)
  1976   – Phil Ochs, American singer-songwriter and guitarist (b. 1940)
  1976   – Renato Petronio, Italian rower (b. 1891)
1978 – Clough Williams-Ellis, English-Welsh architect, designed Portmeirion (b. 1883)
1980 – Muhammad Baqir al-Sadr, Iraqi cleric and philosopher (b. 1935)
1982 – Wilfrid Pelletier, Canadian pianist, composer, and conductor (b. 1896)
1988 – Brook Benton, American singer-songwriter and actor (b. 1931)
  1988   – Hans Berndt, German footballer (b. 1913)
  1988   – Dave Prater, American singer (b. 1937)
1991 – Forrest Towns, American hurdler and coach (b. 1914)
1993 – Joseph B. Soloveitchik, American rabbi and philosopher (b. 1903)
1996 – Richard Condon, American author and publicist (b. 1915)
1997 – Mae Boren Axton, American singer-songwriter (b. 1914)
  1997   – Helene Hanff, American author and screenwriter (b. 1916)
1998 – Tom Cora, American cellist and composer (b. 1953)
1999 – Ibrahim Baré Maïnassara, Nigerien general and politician, President of Niger (b. 1949)
2000 – Tony Cliff, Trotskyist activist and founder of the Socialist Workers Party (b. 1917)
2001 – Willie Stargell, American baseball player and coach (b. 1940)
2002 – Pat Flaherty, American race car driver (b. 1926)
  2002   – Leopold Vietoris, Austrian soldier, mathematician, and academic (b. 1891)
2003 – Jerry Bittle, American cartoonist (b. 1949)
2006 – Billy Hitchcock, American baseball player, coach, manager (b. 1916)
  2006   – Vilgot Sjöman, Swedish director and screenwriter (b. 1924)
2007 – Egon Bondy, Czech philosopher and poet (b. 1930)
  2007   – Dorrit Hoffleit, American astronomer and academic (b. 1907)
2009 – Nick Adenhart, American baseball player (b. 1986)
2010 – Zoltán Varga, Hungarian footballer and manager (b. 1945)
2011 – Zakariya Rashid Hassan al-Ashiri, Bahraini journalist (b. 1971)
  2011   – Sidney Lumet, American director, producer, and screenwriter (b. 1924)
2012 – Malcolm Thomas, Welsh rugby player and cricketer (b. 1929)
2013 – David Hayes, American sculptor and painter (b. 1931)
  2013   – Greg McCrary, American football player (b. 1952)
  2013   – Mordechai Mishani, Israeli lawyer and politician (b. 1945)
  2013   – McCandlish Phillips, American journalist and author (b. 1927)
  2013   – Paolo Soleri, Italian-American architect, designed the Cosanti (b. 1919)
2014 – Gil Askey, American trumpet player, composer, and producer (b. 1925)
  2014   – Chris Banks, American football player (b. 1973)
  2014   – Rory Ellinger, American lawyer and politician (b. 1941)
  2014   – Norman Girvan, Jamaican economist, academic, and politician (b. 1941)
  2014   – Aelay Narendra, Indian politician (b. 1946)
  2014   – A. N. R. Robinson, Trinbagonian politician, 3rd President of Trinidad and Tobago (b. 1926)
  2014   – Svetlana Velmar-Janković, Serbian author (b. 1933)
2015 – Paul Almond, Canadian-American director, producer, and screenwriter (b. 1931)
  2015   – Margaret Rule, British marine archaeologist (b. 1928)
  2015   – Nina Companeez, French director and screenwriter (b. 1937)
  2015   – Alexander Dalgarno, English physicist and academic (b. 1928)
  2015   – Ivan Doig, American journalist and author (b. 1939)
  2015   – Tsien Tsuen-hsuin, Chinese-American academic (b. 1909)
2016 – Duane Clarridge, American spy (b. 1932)
  2016   – Will Smith, American football player (b. 1981)
2017 – John Clarke, New Zealand-Australian comedian, writer, and satirist (b. 1948)
2019 – Charles Van Doren, American writer and editor (b. 1926)
2021 – Prince Philip, Duke of Edinburgh (b. 1921)
  2021   – DMX, American rapper and actor (b. 1970)
  2021   – Nikki Grahame, British reality-TV icon (b. 1982) 
  2021   – Ian Gibson, British scientist and Labour Party politician (b. 1938) 
  2021   – Ramsey Clark, American lawyer (b. 1927)
2022 – Dwayne Haskins, American football player (b. 1997)

Holidays and observances
Christian feast day:
Dietrich Bonhoeffer (Anglicanism, Lutheranism)
Gaucherius
Materiana
Waltrude
April 9 (Eastern Orthodox liturgics)
Anniversary of the German Invasion of Denmark (Denmark)
Baghdad Liberation Day (Iraqi Kurdistan)
Constitution Day (Kosovo)
Day of National Unity (Georgia)
Day of the Finnish Language (Finland)
Day of Valor or Araw ng Kagitingan (Philippines)
Feast of the Second Day of the Writing of the Book of the Law (Thelema)
Martyr's Day (Tunisia)
National Former Prisoner of War Recognition Day (United States) 
Remembrance for Haakon Sigurdsson (The Troth)
Vimy Ridge Day (Canada)

References

External links

 BBC: On This Day
 
 Historical Events on April 9

Days of the year
April